The Fighting Cock is a 1963 Australian television play. It is an adaptation of a play by Jean Anouilh whose original French title was L'Hurluberlu.  In English, it had a run on Broadway, starring Rex Harrison.

It was made at a time Australian drama was relatively rare.

Premise
A postwar general tries to escape everyday realities by retreating into fantasy.

Cast
Alexander Archdale as the general
Malcolm Shield as the General's son Toto
Felicity Young as general's wife Algae
Sandra Power as Sophie
Elizabeth Wing as Bise
Williams Lloyd as Father Gregory
Kendrick Hudson as doctor
Roly Baree as Baron
Hugh Stewart as Lebulluc
Laurence Beck as Mendigales
Frank Rich as Michepain

Reception
The Sydney Morning Herald called it "a thoroughly successful production" with a "virtuoso" performance from Alexander Archdale.

References

External links

Australian television films
1963 television plays
1960s Australian television plays
Films directed by William Sterling (director)